The 2018 UCI Road World Championships were held in Innsbruck, Austria. It was the 91st UCI Road World Championships and the third to be held in Austria.

The World Championships consisted of a total of twelve competitions, one road race, one team time trial and one individual time trial for men and women, as well as one road race and one individual time trial for U23 riders and juniors. The Tour de Suisse organisers were responsible for the operational organisation of the races. The competitions were very demanding: the 265-kilometre men's road race had nine climbs with around 5000 metres of altitude difference. Because of the many climbs, some sprinters did not participate in the World Championships because they saw no prospect of success for themselves. It was the last edition to feature a team time trial for UCI trade teams. From 2019 onwards it will be replaced by a mixed team time trial for national teams.

Schedule
All times are in CEST (UTC+2).

Events summary

Elite events

Under-23 events

Junior events

Medal table

References

External links

 

 

 
UCI Road World Championships by year
World Championships
International cycle races hosted by Austria
2018 in Austrian sport
Sports competitions in Innsbruck
2010s in Innsbruck
UCI Road World Championships